Antaeotricha lacera is a moth in the family Depressariidae. It was described by Philipp Christoph Zeller in 1877. It is found in South America.

References

Moths described in 1877
lacera
Moths of South America